The Lars Vilks Muhammad drawings controversy began in July 2007 with a series of drawings by Swedish artist Lars Vilks that depicted the Islamic prophet Muhammad as a roundabout dog (a form of street installation in Sweden). Several art galleries in Sweden declined to show the drawings, citing security concerns and fear of violence. The controversy gained international attention after the Örebro-based regional newspaper Nerikes Allehanda published one of the drawings on 18 August as part of an editorial on self-censorship and freedom of religion.

While several other leading Swedish newspapers had published the drawings already, this particular publication led to protests from Muslims in Sweden as well as official condemnations from several foreign governments including Islamic State of Iraq, Iran, Pakistan, Afghanistan, Egypt, and Jordan, as well as by the inter-governmental Organisation of the Islamic Conference (OIC). The controversy occurred about a year and a half after the Jyllands-Posten Muhammad cartoons controversy in Denmark in early 2006.

Background 

On 11 June 2007, Vilks was invited to participate in an art exhibition on the theme "The Dog in Art" that was to be held in the small town of Tällerud in Värmland. Vilks submitted three pen and ink drawings on A4 paper depicting Muhammad as a roundabout dog. At this time, Vilks was already participating with drawings of Muhammad in another exhibition in Vestfossen, Norway, on the theme "Oh, My God". Vilks, who is a known proponent of institutional art, has stated that his original intention with the drawings was to "examine the political correctness within the boundaries of the art community". According to Vilks, the art and culture communities in Sweden repeatedly criticize the United States and Israel, whereas Muslim values are rarely even questioned.

On 20 July, the day before the opening of the exhibition in Tällerud, the organizers decided to withdraw Vilks's drawings from the exhibition due to security concerns and fear of violence from Islamic extremists (see Islam and blasphemy and Islam and animals). Märta Wennerström, the exhibition's organizer, said that at first she "didn't realize the gravity of the situation" and that she made the decision to remove the drawings after consulting Swedish government agencies and private persons.

Following the first refusal to publish the drawings, Vilks submitted his drawings to the Gerlesborg School of Fine Art in Bohuslän (where he is a frequent lecturer) for a special teachers' exhibition that was going to be opened on 18 August. On 13 August, however, the school announced that they also had decided to reject the drawings due to security concerns. This second rejection started an intense debate in the Swedish media about self-censorship and freedom of expression.

On 18 August, the Örebro-based regional newspaper Nerikes Allehanda published one of Vilks's drawings in an editorial on freedom of expression. The editorial defended "Muslims' right to freedom of religion" but also said it must be permitted to "ridicule Islam's most foremost symbols — just like all other religions' symbols." On the same day, the drawings were also published in several other Swedish newspapers including Aftonbladet, Dagens Nyheter, Expressen and Upsala Nya Tidning.

Reactions

International reactions 
On 27 August, the Swedish chargée d'affaires in Tehran, Gunilla von Bahr, was summoned to the Iranian foreign ministry where she received a protest from the Iranian government against the publication in Nerikes Allehanda. On 28 August, the President of Iran, Mahmoud Ahmadinejad, commented on the drawings during a press conference. He was quoted by the Islamic Republic News Agency as saying: "Religions call for friendship, equality, justice, peace and respect for divine prophets. The Zionists only pretend to believe in religion. They are telling lies. They are perpetrating oppression against the Europeans and putting at risk the prestige of Europe."

On 30 August, the Swedish chargé d'affaires in Islamabad, Lennart Holst, was summoned to the Pakistani Ministry of Foreign Affairs to receive a similar protest from the Pakistani government. The Pakistani Ministry of Foreign Affairs later issued a statement where it condemned the publication "in the strongest terms".

On the same day, the Organisation of the Islamic Conference (OIC), an inter-governmental organization which represents 57 Muslim countries, issued a statement where it strongly condemned the publishing of blasphemous caricatures of Muhammad by Swedish artist Lars Vilks in the Nerikes Allehanda newspaper. The secretary-general of OIC, Ekmeleddin İhsanoğlu, further called on the Swedish government to take "immediate punitive actions against the artist and the publishers of the cartoon and asked for their unqualified apology".

On 31 August, supporters from Islamic parties in Pakistan burned the Swedish flag in the city of Lahore. In Karachi, others torched an effigy of the Swedish Prime Minister to protest the cartoon.

On 1 September, the Afghan newspaper Kabul Times published a statement by religious scholars, imams and the Afghan Ministry of Islamic Guidance. The statement said that "The sold-out enemies of Islam draw the cartoon of the respected Prophet of Islam once more. This has disturbed the Islamic world and aroused the indignation of all Muslims". The statement demanded those responsible be handed over to a court for prosecution and punishment.

On 3 September, the Egyptian Ministry of Religious Endowments condemned the publication, saying that "such an irresponsible act is not conducive to friendly ties between the Islamic world and the west". On the same day, also the Jordanian government condemned the publication. A spokesperson for the government said that "The publication of this cartoon, which seeks to attack the character of the Prophet Mohammed, is unacceptable, rejected and condemned".

Domestic reactions 
On 25 August, a group of about 60 Muslims held a demonstration outside Nerikes Allehanda'''s office in Örebro to protest against the publication.

On 31 August, Swedish Prime Minister Fredrik Reinfeldt commented on the issue and said: "I think it's important to say two things. First, we are eager to ensure that Sweden remains a country in which Muslims and Christians, people who believe in God and people who don't believe in God, can live side by side in a spirit of mutual respect [...] We are also eager to stand up for freedom of expression, which is enshrined in the constitution and comes naturally to us, and which ensures that we do not make political decisions about what gets published in the newspapers. I want to make sure we keep things that way." The same day, around 300 demonstrators – led by the Islamic Cultural Centre in Örebro – assembled outside the offices of Nerikes Allehanda to protest against the newspaper's publication.

On 7 September, Prime Minister Fredrik Reinfeldt met with ambassadors from 22 Muslim countries to discuss the issue. Reinfeldt said that he had "explained how Swedish society works and that we don't have elected representatives making editorial decisions", adding that "this is an open country, a tolerant country". Prior to the meeting, Egyptian ambassador Mohamed Sotouhi said, according to the news agency TT, that he and a group of fellow ambassadors had agreed on a list of measures that Sweden needed to take and to present it to the Prime Minister. "We want to see action, not just nice words. We have to push for a change in the law", he said.

After the meeting however, Reinfeldt denied that any such list had been presented to him. According to the Syrian Arab News Agency, a statement had been delivered from the Swedish embassy in Damascus to Syria's Grand Mufti Ahmad Bader Hassoun in which Reinfeldt "expressed his regret of the incident which has offended and upset Muslims, calling against instigating or offending other religions". The Swedish government has not commented on this statement.

Also on 7 September, a group of about 550 Muslims gathered outside the offices of the newspaper Upsala Nya Tidning in Uppsala, to protest against the newspaper's publication of the cartoons.

 Threats and attacks 
Following the publication in Nerikes Allehanda, the Swedish police raised the security level around the newspaper's headquarters and some of its employees have been forced to use bodyguards after receiving death threats. Vilks himself has also received several death threats. One Muslim woman in western Sweden has been arrested on charges of issuing a death threat against Vilks in an e-mail. The woman confirmed in police interrogation that she had written the mail and said that she did not have any regrets about it. On 6 September, one actual roundabout dog created by Vilks and local children was set alight as an apparent threat.

On 15 September, it was reported that the group Islamic State of Iraq had placed a bounty of at least $100,000 on the head of Lars Vilks and $50,000 on Ulf Johansson, editor-in-chief of Nerikes Allehanda. The statement was found in an audio file on an Islamist website and was read by a person who identified himself as Abu Omar al-Baghdadi, the purported head of the Islamic State of Iraq. "We announce a reward of $100,000 to anyone who kills this infidel criminal. This reward will be raised to $150,000 if he is slaughtered like a lamb," the statement said. The statement also threatened attacks on Swedish companies unless unspecified "crusaders" issued an apology. Vilks responded to the statement by saying: "I suppose this makes my art project a bit more serious. It's also good to know how much one is worth".

The United States-based SITE Institute has reported that websites run by militant Islamists have listed the names of over 100 Swedish companies with addresses, maps and logos. The websites called for their readers to boycott these firms and "take revenge" on Sweden for the publication of the drawings.

The European Council for Fatwa and Research (ECFR) and the Federation of Islamic Organizations in Europe (FIOE) both condemned the death threats against Vilks and Johansson. ECFR also said it planned to issue a "counter fatwa" against the threats.

The World Association of Newspapers (WAN), which represents over 18,000 newspapers around the world, issued a statement where it condemned the death threats and expressed support for Nerikes Allehanda in its right to publish the drawing.

 9 March 2010 arrests 
On 9 March 2010, seven people were arrested in the Republic of Ireland over an alleged plot to assassinate Vilks. The arrested were originally from Morocco and Yemen and had refugee status. Of the seven, three men and two women were arrested in Waterford and Tramore and another man and woman at Ballincollig, near Cork. Garda Síochána (the Irish police force), which conducted the arrests with support from the counter-terror Special Detective Unit and the National Support Services, said the suspects range in age from mid 20s to late 40s. The Garda Síochána also added that throughout the investigation they had been "working closely with law enforcement agencies in the United States and in a number of European countries".

The same day, Colleen R. LaRose from the Philadelphia, US, suburbs, had her federal indictment unsealed charging her with trying to recruit Islamic terrorists to murder Vilks.

 2010 Stockholm bombings 

An emailed threat sent to a news agency and to the Swedish Security Service occurred made reference to this incident."Stockholm explosions leave one dead and two injured" Afterwards, two bombs exploded, injuring two people and killing the would-be attacker.

 2010 Copenhagen terror plot 

At the time of the December 2010 terror arrests, Lars Vilks' home page was subject to a hacker attack. According to Vilks' blog, the hacker declared the attacks would be continued with no end and that the targets are Vilks, Kurt Westergaard, and Geert Wilders.

 2013 Al-Qaeda's most wanted 
In 2013, cartoonist Stéphane "Charb" Charbonnier was added to Al-Qaeda's most wanted list, along with Lars Vilks and three Jyllands-Posten'' staff members: Kurt Westergaard, Carsten Juste, and Flemming Rose.

2015 Copenhagen shootings 

On 14 February 2015, shots were fired at a public meeting in Denmark attended by Vilks, leaving one civilian dead and three policemen wounded. The attacker fled after a brief gunfight with police and was later shot dead the next day after committing another shooting at a Jewish synagogue, killing one person and injuring two policemen.

See also 
 
 Charlie Hebdo shooting
 Jyllands-Posten Muhammad cartoons controversy
 Islam in Sweden
 Depictions of Muhammad
 Islam and animals
 Islam and blasphemy

References

External links 
Cartoon on Lars Vilks' website
"Lars Vilks Cartoon" Stockholm News; March 13, 2010

Caricature
Islam-related controversies in Europe
Events relating to freedom of expression
2007 controversies
Cartoon controversies
Controversies in Sweden
Censorship in Islam
Islam in Sweden
Cultural depictions of Muhammad